USS LST-310 was one of 390 tank landing ships (LSTs) built for the United States Navy during World War II.

LST-310 was laid down on 22 September 1942 at the Boston Navy Yard; launched on 23 November 1942; sponsored by Mrs. Inga M. Gustavson; and commissioned on 20 January 1943.

Service history
During World War II, LST-310 was assigned to the European Theater and participated in the Sicilian occupation in July, 1943 the landings at Salerno in September, 1943 and the Invasion of Normandy in June, 1944.

Upon her return to the United States, she was decommissioned on 16 May 1945 for conversion to landing craft repair ship USS Aeolus (ARL-42) at the Boston Navy Yard. The conversion was canceled 12 September 1945 and the ship reverted to LST-310; she was struck from the Naval Vessel Register on 12 March 1946. On 28 January 1947 the ship was sold to the Boston Metals Company of Baltimore, Maryland for conversion to merchant service.

She was sold (date unknown) to the Panama Navigation Corporation, and subsequently named MV Mercator and re-flagged as Panamanian. Sometime prior to 1963 the ship was sold to Navemar S. A. (name retained) and re-flagged Argentine. Her final fate is unknown.

Ship Awards
LST-310 earned two battle stars for World War II service.
Combat Action Ribbon (Retroactive)
American Ribbon
World War II Victory Medal
Europe African Middle Eastern Campaigns Medal(3)

References

See also
 List of United States Navy LSTs

World War II amphibious warfare vessels of the United States
Ships built in Boston
1942 ships
LST-1-class tank landing ships of the United States Navy